The Electoral district of Korong was an electoral district of the Legislative Assembly in the Australian state of Victoria.

It was created by Electoral Act Amendment Act 1888 its area was defined as: "Commencing at the intersection of the Loddon River with the Eaglehawk and Inglewood Railway ; thence down the river to the north-east angle of the parish of Leaghur; along the northern and western boundaries of that parish to south-east angle of the parish of Gredgwin ; along the south and south-western boundaries of that parish to the south-east angle of the parish of Quambatook ; westerly by the south boundary of that parish to the Avoca River ; southerly by that river to the Avoca Forest pre-emptive right; north-easterly by the road from Avoca Forest to Inglewood through Wehla to the west boundary of Inglewood borough (as described in the 'Local Government Act' 1874); north, east, and south along the west, north, and east boundaries of the borough to the Eaglehawk and Inglewood Railway line ; south-easterly by that line to the commencing point".

Members for Korong

Election results

See also
 Electoral district of Korong and Eaglehawk
 Electoral district of Eaglehawk

References

Former electoral districts of Victoria (Australia)
1889 establishments in Australia
1927 disestablishments in Australia
1945 establishments in Australia
1955 disestablishments in Australia